Hanna Chang and Alexa Glatch were the defending champions but Glatch chose not to participate. Chang partnered alongside Makenna Jones, but lost in the semifinals to Han Na-lae and Jang Su-jeong.

Sophie Chang and Anna Danilina won the title, defeating Han and Jang in the final, 2–6, 7–6(7–4), [11–9].

Seeds

Draw

Draw

References

External links
Main Draw

Koser Jewelers Tennis Challenge - Doubles